A number of ships have been named Nightingale, including:

, wrecked in January 1933
, a Type C2 cargo ship

Ship names